Alfa Castaldi (19 December 1926 – 17 December 1995) was an Italian photographer.

Career
He began his photographic career in 1954, depicting the social life of his native Milan for Italian magazines, moving into fashion photography in the 1960s, when he provided images for Novità (which became Vogue Italia in 1966), Linea Italiana, and Arianna. Castaldi married Anna Piaggi in New York in 1962. By 1969 he was one of the major contributors to Vogue Italia. At the end of the 1960s, opening a studio in Milan, he expanded into advertising, creating campaigns for the likes of Giorgio Armani, Laura Biagiotti, Fendi, Gianfranco Ferré, Karl Lagerfield and Ottavio and Rosita Missoni. His magazine coverage also expanded, with his work appearing in L'Uomo Vogue, Vanity, Vogue Bambini, Vogue Sposa, and, outside the Condé Nast Publications, Amica, Panorama and L'Espresso.

Biography
In the time of the 1950s, Castaldi served as a reporter and he was in close relation to Ugo Mulas. Together they joined with other artists of various forms and lived what was recorded to be a bohemian lifestyle. Although Castaldi studied under an art critic while he was in college, the career of being a critic was not what he wanted to do because it didn't appeal to him. He rather became interested in reporter photography and editorials. That is when he began his photography interest and became a freelance with the major magazines of his time.

Education
Castaldi studied and received his education in the History of the Arts at the University of Florence. There he was able to study with the Italian art critic who was known as Roberto Longhi. It is recorded that Castaldi actually became of the Longhi's favorite students.

Family
Castaldi was married to Anna Piaggi. They met when he started to work with her on fashion stories. They were together until his death. He met her in the year of 1958. They married four years after they met.

Death
Castaldi died in 1995, in Milan, Italy.

References

1995 deaths
1926 births
Photographers from Milan
University of Florence alumni